Overkill may refer to:

 Overkill (term), the use of excessive force or action to achieve a goal
 Surplus killing, when a predator kills more prey than it can eat
 Overexploitation, depletion of a natural resource through overharvesting
 Overfishing
 Overkill hypothesis, a proposed cause of Quaternary extinction

Characters 
 Overkill (G.I. Joe), a character in the G.I. Joe universe
 Overkill (Transformers), a character in the Transformers universe
 Overkill, a character in the Marvel Comics O-Force team
 Scarlet Overkill, main antagonist in Minions (2015 film)

Literature 
 Overkill (comic book), a British comics anthology
 Overkill (novel), a 2007 novel by Vanda Symon
 Overkill, a 1966 spy novel by William Garner
 Overkill, a 2001 true crime book by Lyn Riddle about the 1991 murder of Laurie Show

Music
 Overkill (band), an American thrash metal band from New Jersey
 Overkill (EP) an EP by the New Jersey band, or the title song
 Overkill L.A., originally Overkill, an American speed metal/hardcore band from Los Angeles
 Overkill (Motörhead album), a 1979 album by Motörhead
 "Overkill" (Motörhead song), 1979
 Overkill (Savant album), 2013
 "Overkill" (Men at Work song), 1983
 "Overkill", a song by Holly Humberstone, 2020
 "Overkill", a song by Kosheen from Damage, 2007

Television and film 
 "Overkill" (Murder Most Horrid), a television episode
 Overkill, a 1987 film directed by Ulli Lommel

Games 
 Overkill (Flying Buffalo), a 1977 role-playing game adventure
 OverKill (video game), a 1992 vertical scrolling shooter
 The House of the Dead: Overkill, a 2009 rail shooter gun game
 Overkill Software, a Swedish video game developer
 Overkills, finishing moves in the video games Eternal Champions and Eternal Champions: Challenge from the Dark Side

See also 
 Overkiller, a music DVD by Die Ärzte
 Superfluous (disambiguation)
 Third wheel (disambiguation)